Carex albula, common name white sedge, is a species of sedge (in the Cyperaceae family). It is endemic to the South Island of New Zealand.

According to Plants of the World online, it has no synonyms.  However the New Zealand Plant Conservation Network lists Carex comans var stricta Cheeseman as a synonym.

Description
It is a densely tufted sedge growing from 250 to 350 mm tall, and may be buff-coloured, an almost bleached white, or green or red.
The culms are smooth and 50-200 mm by 0.5 mm, often having a deep groove. The leaves are numerous and the basal sheaths are dark brown to purple-red.  The terminal spike is male with the other spikes being female.

It flowers from October to December and fruits from October to September and the nuts are dispersed by granivory and wind.

Distribution & habitat
It is found in the South Island from the Mackenzie Basin, to Waitaki and Central Otago, on alluvial terraces, and slopes and on river flats.

Conservation status
The IUCN Redlist declared its conservation status to be of "least concern" (LC). However, assessments under the New Zealand Threat Classification System (NZTCS), declared it to be "At Risk – Declining" (Dec) in 2013, and in 2017  to be "Threatened – Nationally Vulnerable" (NV).

References

External links
Carex albula New Zealand Plant Conservation Network 
Carex albula occurrence data from GBIF

albula
Plants described in 1947
Taxa named by Harry Allan
Flora of New Zealand